The following television stations operate on virtual channel 57 in the United States:

 K09DM-D in Cortez, Colorado
 K21KB-D in Brookings, Oregon
 KAZH-LD in McAllen, Texas
 KFUL-LD in San Luis Obispo, California
 KJLA in Ventura, California
 KUBE-TV in Baytown, Texas
 KWOG in Springdale, Arkansas
 KXTU-LD in Colorado Springs, Colorado
 W25AT-D in Tupper Lake, New York
 W25BT-D in Monkton, Vermont
 WACH in Columbia, South Carolina
 WATC-DT in Atlanta, Georgia
 WBND-LD in South Bend, Indiana
 WBWP-LD in West Palm Beach, Florida
 WCFE-TV in Plattsburgh, New York
 WCVW in Richmond, Virginia
 WDCI-LD in Chicago, Illinois
 WFXU in Live Oak, Florida
 WGBY-TV in Springfield, Massachusetts
 WIFS in Janesville, Wisconsin
 WMLD-LD in Brownsville, Florida
 WPSG in Philadelphia, Pennsylvania
 WYMT-TV in Hazard, Kentucky

The following stations, which are no longer licensed, formerly operated on virtual channel 57:
 W46IT-D in Port Henry, New York

References

57 virtual